The Mwani language, also known by its native name Kimwani, is a Bantu language spoken on the coast of the Cabo Delgado Province of Mozambique, including the Quirimbas Islands. Although it shares high lexical similarity (60%) with Swahili, it is not intelligible with it. It is spoken by around 120,000 people (including 20,000 who use it as their second language). Speakers also use Portuguese (the official language of Mozambique), Swahili and Makhuwa language. Kiwibo,  the dialect of the Island of Ibo is the prestige dialect. Kimwani (sometimes spelled as Quimuane) is also called Mwani (sometimes spelled as: Mwane, Muane) and Ibo. According to Anthony P. Grant Kimwani of northern Mozambique appears to be the result of imperfect shift towards Swahili several centuries ago by speakers of Makonde, and Arends et al. suggest it might turn out to be a Makonde–Swahili mixed language.

Name 

The name of the language comes from the word "Mwani", meaning "beach". The prefix "Ki" means the language of, so "Kimwani" literally means "language of the beach".

Sounds 
Kimwani (similar to Swahili) is unusual among sub-Saharan languages in having lost the feature of lexical tone (with the exception of some verbal paradigms where its use is optional). It does not have the penultimate stress typical of Swahili; it has movable pitch accent. Labialization of consonants (indicated by a [w] following the consonant) and palatalization of r (ry; [rj]) are frequent. Nasalization of vowels occurs only before a nasal consonant n followed by a consonant.

Vowels 
It does not have a distinction of closed and open mid vowels typical of Portuguese or French and found in some other Bantu languages like Lingala, Fang, and perhaps Sukuma.

The pronunciation of the phoneme /i/ stands between International Phonetic Alphabet [i] and [e]. Vowels are never reduced, regardless of stress. The vowels are pronounced as follows:

  is pronounced like the "a" in start
  is pronounced like the "e" in bed
  is pronounced like the "y" in happy
  is pronounced like the "o" in or
  is pronounced like the "u" in Susan.

Kimwani has no diphthongs; in vowel combinations, each vowel is pronounced separately.

Consonants 
Two symbols in a table cell denote the voiceless and voiced consonant, respectively.

Orthography 
Kimwani can be spelled in three ways: using orthography similar to Swahili, using a slightly modified spelling system used in Mozambique schools or using a Portuguese-based spelling. Here are the differences:

Numbers 

moja (1), mbili (2), natu (3), n’né (4), tano (5)

sita (6), saba (7), nane (8), kenda (9)

kumi (10), kumi na moja (11),kumi na mbili (12)

Ishirini (20), thelathini (30), arubaini (40), hamsini (50)

sitini (60), sabini (70), themanini (80), tisini (90)

mia (100), mia mbili (200)

Elfu (1000) elfu mbili (2000)

References 

 Petzell, Malin. A sketch of Kimwani (a minority language of Mozambique); Africa & Asia, #2, pp.  88–110, Göteborg University. 2002. 
 Namuna ya kufifunda kufyoma na kwandika (Manual de transição, língua Kimwani); SIL & JUWA;  Pemba, Cabo Delgado, Mozambique. 2002.
 

Languages of Mozambique
Swahili language